Emlyn Williams (1905–1987) was a Welsh dramatist and actor.

Emlyn Williams may also refer to:

Emlyn Williams (footballer, born 1903) (1903–?), Welsh football player for Hull City
Emlyn Williams (footballer, born 1912) (1912–1989), Welsh football player for Barnsley and Preston North End
Emlyn Williams (trade unionist) (1921–1995), Welsh trade union leader